Loughborough Students' Hockey Club is the field hockey club of Loughborough University.

Recent history
The men's 1st XI compete in the Men's England Hockey League and were winners of the BUCS championships for eight of the past thirteen years.
They have also won the National Indoor Championships four times since 2003, as well as gold (2004) and bronze (2005) at the European Indoor Challenge, and were quarter-finalists in the Euro Hockey League in 2008. The other men's teams compete in the Midlands League.

The club currently run four teams and compete in the following competitions;

1st XI – Men's England Hockey League, BUCS Premier League, BUCS KO Championship
2nd XI – 2nd XI Midlands Premier League, BUCS National League, BUCS Trophy KO Cup
3rd XI – 3rd XI Midlands Premier League, BUCS League Midlands 1A, BUCS Trophy KO Cup
4th XI – Central League – Midlands Premier Division, BUCS League Midlands 2A, BUCS Conference KO Cup

The Women's 1st XI team competes in the Premier league of the Women's England Hockey League, BUCS . The team has had great success in BUCS having previously won the Hockey Championship for eleven years straight up to 2008 and are current champions.

The women's club currently run five teams and compete in the following competitions;

1st XI - EH Premier League, BUCS Premier League, BUCS KO Championship
2nd XI - EH National League North, BUCS League National league, BUCS Trophy KO Cup
3rd XI - Midlands Division 1, BUCS League Midlands 2B, BUCS Conference KO Cup
4th XI - Leicestershire Women's League Premier Division, BUCS League Midlands 2B, BUCS Conference KO Cup
5th XI - Leicestershire Women's League Division 1, BUCS League Midlands 4B, BUCS Conference KO Cup

Current squad

Men 
Murray Collins – Scotland 
Ronan Harvey-Kelly - GB U21
Ed Greaves – Scotland 
Evan Kimber - GB U21
Matthew Ramshaw - GB U21
Tom Crowson - GB U21
Hamish Roberts - Scotland U21
Rohan Bhuhi - GB U21
Daniel West - GB U21
Elliot Smith – England U18

Women
 Lizzie Neal -GB Senior
 Charlotte Watson - GB Senior
 Izzy Petter - GB Senior

Notable players

Men's internationals

 Alistair McGregor 
 David Ralph
 Derek Salmond
 Mark Zander

 James Davies-Yandle
 Matt Grace
 Zak Jones

 Rob Smith 

 Fabio Reinhard

Others
 Danny Kerry - England/Great Britain coach

Women's internationals

 Robyn Collins

Honours
Men's National Cup
Runners Up: 2004–05

References

 
English field hockey clubs
Hockey
Lough